Charles Hughes Kirbo (March 5, 1917 – September 2, 1996) was an American lawyer and longtime advisor to Jimmy Carter. He served as the Chairman of the Democratic Party in Georgia for two years from 1972-1974.

Early life and legal career
Kirbo was born on March 5, 1917, in Bainbridge, Georgia.  He graduated from the University of Georgia School of Law in 1939 and later served in the United States Army in World War II.  In 1960, Kirbo became a partner in the law firm of King & Spalding.

Political career
Kirbo first represented Jimmy Carter in 1962 when Carter lost the Democratic primary for a Georgia state senate seat.  After Kirbo was able to establish that the primary results were fraudulent, Carter won the nomination and then the general election.  In 1971, then-Governor Jimmy Carter offered to appoint Kirbo to the United States Senate seat left vacant by the death of Richard Russell, but Kirbo declined.  When Carter was elected President, Kirbo was considered as a possible White House Chief of Staff.  Kirbo was also considered to be a candidate for the Supreme Court if a vacancy had occurred under a Carter Presidency.

Death
Kirbo died on September 2, 1996 in Atlanta of complications from gall bladder surgery.

See also
Jimmy Carter Supreme Court candidates

References

1917 births
1996 deaths
Carter administration personnel
Georgia (U.S. state) Democrats
People from Bainbridge, Georgia
University of Georgia alumni
Georgia (U.S. state) lawyers
State political party chairs of Georgia (U.S. state)